George Thomas Bird (1900-date of death unknown) was an English runner.

Athletics
He competed in the 440 yards at the 1930 British Empire Games for England.

Personal life
He was a clerk by trade.

References

1900 births
Year of death missing
Athletes (track and field) at the 1930 British Empire Games
Commonwealth Games competitors for England
English male sprinters